Chris Zylka (born Christopher Michael Settlemire; May 9, 1985) is an American actor and model, known for his roles in the films Shark Night (2011), The Amazing Spider-Man (2012), Doyce Plunk in the TV series Zeke and Luther (2009–2011), and Tom Garvey in the HBO series The Leftovers (2014–2017).

Early life
Zylka was born and raised in Howland Township, Ohio, United States. He took his mother's maiden name, Zylka, as a stage name. Zylka was raised by his mother and has never met his biological father.

He graduated from Howland High School in 2003. Zylka studied art at the University of Toledo for two years, but dropped out to care for his maternal grandfather when he suddenly became ill. His grandfather is from Ukraine.

At the age of 19, he relocated to Los Angeles to pursue a career in acting. He was homeless for six months upon arriving to Los Angeles and lived in his car in the parking lot of a 7-Eleven in Burbank. Zylka described this time in his life by saying, "For about six months I lived in a '94 Ford Probe behind a 7-11 parking lot. I wound up leaving it in the lot because it wouldn't start anymore, and it just kind of became my home. I think that's where my naivety helped or I was just being stupid! I had this adolescent mind telling me everything was going to be okay, and it was. I've been very fortunate." Zylka began working at restaurants, where he was discovered by manager and acting coach Jon Simmons.

Career

Acting 
Zylka began his acting career with a guest appearance as Jason on the teen drama television series 90210 in 2008. He was cast in a recurring role in Everybody Hates Chris and had guest roles in television shows Hannah Montana, Cougar Town and Zeke and Luther. In 2009, Zylka landed a 16-episode recurring role as Joey Donner in sitcom 10 Things I Hate About You. Zylka began to move into films around this time, appearing in the comedy film The People I've Slept With (2009) and the horror television film My Super Psycho Sweet 16 (2009). Zylka would later reprise this role in the sequel, My Super Psycho Sweet 16: Part 2 (2010). He portrayed Thor in the mystery comedy film Kaboom (2010), which premiered at the 2010 Cannes Film Festival.

Zylka starred in two animal-attack-themed films, Shark Night (2011) and Piranha 3DD (2012). Zylka portrayed Flash Thompson in the superhero film The Amazing Spider-Man (2012). He played the role of Jake Armstrong in The CW's supernatural drama television series The Secret Circle. He had a leading role as Kermit in the crime drama film Dixieland (2015). The film centers around good-hearted Kermit, who just got out of prison and returns home to Mississippi.

He played Tom Garvey in HBO's supernatural television series The Leftovers from 2014 to 2017. He portrayed Alex Lachan in Lifetime's television film I Killed My BFF (2015). The film is inspired by a true story, the murder of Anne Marie Camp by Jamie Dennis and her husband, Michael Gianakos, in Minnesota in 1997. He played Chuck Harris in the drama film Novitiate (2017). The film received generally positive reviews from critics and fans. In 2018, he directed Paris Hilton's music video for the song "I Need You". He portrayed Will Jefford Jr. in the drama film The Death & Life of John F. Donovan (2018), released in September 2018. In April 2019, Zylka was cast in a recurring role in USA Network's teen drama television series Dare Me. The series follows the lives of competitive high school cheerleaders in a small Midwestern town. In April 2020, USA Network canceled the series after one season. On May 29, 2019, talent agency ICM Partners announced that they signed Zylka. Zylka portrayed Adult Ray in the short film Sorry or What Could Have Been (2020) opposite Paris Hilton.

Modeling 
Early in his career, Zylka appeared in an advertising campaign for Abercrombie & Fitch, shot by photographer Bruce Weber. He has appeared on the cover of several magazines, including Wonderland, Glamoholic and Bello.

Art 
He enjoys painting and is also an artist. Zylka started artmaking when he was nine years old. He described his art often coming from "a darker place”. He launched his first art exhibition titled "Why Use A Name" at Pikes Hotel in Ibiza, Spain in August 2018.

Personal life
Zylka dated actress Lucy Hale for nine months, and the couple split in September 2012. He was engaged to model Hanna Beth Merjos in April 2014. The couple called off the engagement and broke up in early 2015. Zylka became engaged to heiress and media personality Paris Hilton in January 2018. He proposed to her with a ring worth US$2 million during a vacation in Aspen, after one year of dating. The couple called off the engagement in November 2018.

He has several tattoos, including a tattoo that says "Mom" in a heart, "an angel gone bad" and a gorilla.

Filmography

References

External links

 
 

1985 births
21st-century American male actors
American male film actors
American male television actors
American people of Ukrainian descent
Living people
Male actors from Ohio
University of Toledo alumni